Sachet–Parampara are an Indian music composer, vocalist and lyricist duo consisting of Sachet Tandon and Parampara Thakur. Their song "Bekhayali" from Kabir Singh (2019) became chartbuster even before its release along with Shiv Tandav Stotram (2021), Maiyya Mainu from Jersey (2022) amongst various others went viral with several cover versions available on YouTube. They won array of awards including IIFA (2020), Filmfare (2020), Zee Cine Awards (2020), Mirchi Music Awards, Best Play Back Singer at Star Screen Awards (2019).

The duo is known for their work in Hindi films including Toilet: EkPrem Katha (2017), Bhoomi (2017), YamlaPaglaDeewanaPhir Se (2018),[2] Batti Gul Meter Chalu (2018), Pal Pal Dil Ke Paas (2019),Kabir Singh (2019), Tanhaji (2020) and Jersey (2022).

Early life 
Sachet Tandon and Parampara Thakur were born in Lucknow and Delhi respectively in 1989 and 1992 respectively. After becoming finalist of India's first season of reality show The Voice India  in 2015, the duo was formed in year 2016.
Sachet completed his schooling from St. Fidelis College. Sachet and Parampara completed their education from Lucknow University and Lady Shri Ram College in Delhi respectively.

Personal life 
Sachet Tandon and Parampara Thakur got married on 27 November 2020.

Track listing 
This list contains songs that are sung/composed by Sachet Tandon or Parampara Thakur or both.

Albums / Singles
This list contains songs that are sung/composed by Sachet Tandon or Parampara Thakur or both.

External links 

 Sachet-Parampara on Twitter
 
 sachet-parampara at Bollywood Hungama

References 

Living people
Music directors
Indian film score composers
Indian musical duos
21st-century Indian composers
Year of birth missing (living people)